Jì is the Mandarin pinyin romanization of the Chinese surname written  in simplified Chinese and  in traditional Chinese. It is romanized as Chi in Wade–Giles and Gai or Kai in Cantonese. Ji is listed 263rd in the Song Dynasty classic text Hundred Family Surnames. It is not among the 300 most common surnames in China.

Origin
The Ji 蓟 surname originated from the state of Ji 蓟. According to tradition, after King Wu of Zhou conquered the Shang dynasty in 1046/45 BC, he enfeoffed a descendant of the Yellow Emperor at the settlement of Ji, in modern Beijing municipality. Ji was conquered by the neighbouring state of Yan in the 7th century BC, and the people of Ji adopted the name of their former state as their surname.

The most prominent clan (junwang, 郡望) of the Ji surname in history is that of the Neihuang Commandery, in modern Henan province.

Notable people
Ji Zixun (蓟子训), Eastern Han dynasty Taoist who became revered as an immortal

References

Chinese-language surnames
Individual Chinese surnames